In computing, netsh, or network shell, is a command-line utility included in Microsoft's Windows NT line of operating systems beginning with Windows 2000. It allows local or remote configuration of network devices such as the interface.

Overview
A common use of netsh is to reset the TCP/IP stack to default, known-good parameters, a task that in Windows 98 required reinstallation of the TCP/IP adapter.

netsh, among many other things, also allows the user to change the IP address on their machine.

Starting from Windows Vista, one can also edit wireless settings (for example, SSID) using netsh.

netsh can also be used to read information from the IPv6 stack.

The command netsh winsock reset can be used to reset TCP/IP problems when communicating with a networked device.

References

Further reading

External links

 Using Netsh from Microsoft TechNet
 Netsh Commands for Wireless Local Area Network (WLAN) in Windows Server 2008 R2 (includes Windows 7), from Microsoft TechNet. Topic not covered in "Using netsh".
 online tool to build address bind commands
 netsh commands supported by Windows Vista, 7 and Server 2008 (output of "netsh ?")
 Windows Server 2008 R2 and Windows Server 2008 Netsh Technical Reference (chm)

Windows communication and services
Windows administration
Windows components